Christian Friedrich Penzel (25 November 173714 March 1801) was a German musician.  Although he was a composer in his own right, he is remembered more for his association with Johann Sebastian Bach. He was one of Bach's last pupils and is known for his copies of Bach's works.

School career
Penzel started at the Thomasschule, Leipzig in 1749 while Bach held the position of Thomaskantor. Bach died the following year. 

After Bach's death, Penzel became a prefect at the school under Bach's successor Johann Gottlob Harrer. The position involved him directing the boys' choir (Thomanerchor) on occasion.  Harrer needed a deputy because he had health problems: he died in 1755 while taking the waters at Carlsbad.

Later career
Penzel studied at Leipzig University.

Works copied by Penzel
The music sung by the Thomanerchor in the 1750s included revivals of Bach's vocal music, which partly explains Penzel's interest in Bach's cantatas. For several cantatas Penzel's copy is the oldest surviving source. He also copied instrumental works including early versions of the Brandenburg Concertos (for example, what appears to be the earliest version of the first Brandenburg Concerto).

References

German composers
Pupils of Johann Sebastian Bach
People educated at the St. Thomas School, Leipzig
Leipzig University alumni
Music copyists
1737 births
1801 deaths